Maksim Dmitriyevich Shiryayev (born 28 September 1975) is a former Russian football player.

External links
 

1975 births
Footballers from Moscow
Living people
Russian footballers
FC Torpedo Moscow players
FC Torpedo-2 players
Russian Premier League players
Association football midfielders